
Year 650 (DCL) was a common year starting on Friday (link will display the full calendar) of the Julian calendar. The denomination 650 for this year has been used since the early medieval period, when the Anno Domini calendar era became the prevalent method in Europe for naming years.

Events 
 By place 

 Europe 
 The Khazar Khaganate extends from the Dnieper to the Caspian Sea, and establishes the city, Itil, as its capital on the shore of the Caspian. Northward it extends to the headwaters of the Volga. Their rulers accept the Jewish religion, apparently to assert their independence from both Muslims and Christians (approximate date).
 A Rashidun army under Abd ar-Rahman ibn Rabiah is annihilated by the Khazars, near the city of Balanjar (Northern Caucasus). During the battle, both sides use catapults against the other (approximate date).

 Britain 
 The Mercians under King Penda move on East Anglia, destroy the monastery at Burgh Castle and expel King Anna who probably flees to Magonsæte (approximate date).
 King Oswiu of Bernicia seeks Irish support against the forces of Penda. While in Ireland he has a liaison with Fín, the granddaughter of King Colmán Rímid Uí Néill (approximate date).
 King Cloten of Dyfed (Southern Wales) marries Princess Ceindrech of Brycheiniog, and unites the two kingdoms (approximate date).

 Asia 
 The first Chinese paper money is issued, yet these banknotes will not become government-issued until the Song Dynasty era Sichuan province issues them in the year 1024, with the central government of China following suit in the 12th century. 
 Emperor Kōtoku is presented a white pheasant; he is pleased and begins a new Japanese era name (nengō) to be called Hakuchi, meaning 'The White Pheasant'.

 Americas 
 Earliest confirmed date of habitation in the area around what is now Bluff, Utah by humans.
 Yuknoom the Great, ruler of Calakmul, attacks Dos Pilas and forces its leader, B'alaj Chan K'awiil, and a likely heir to the throne of Tikal, to take refuge at Aguateca, beginning the Second Tikal-Calakmul War.
 Jamaica is settled by the Ostinoid people, ancestors of the Taíno. They were farmers, potters, and villagers with socially complex societies. These people lived near the coast and extensively hunted turtles and fish.

Oceania
 According to legend, the Polynesian traveller Ui-te-Rangiora sailed south into the Southern Ocean where they sighted ice floes and icebergs, eventually naming the area Te tai-uka-a-pia.

 By topic 

 Religion 
 St. Martin's Church is built in Canterbury, England (approximate date).

 Art and science 
 The panel of the Tamamushi Shrine, the so called "Hungry Tigress Jataka", is made during the Asuka period (Japan). It is now kept at Horyu-ji Treasure House (approximate date).

Births 
 Anastasia, Byzantine empress (approximate date)
 Dagobert II, king of Austrasia (approximate date)
 Frithuswith, Anglo-Saxon abbess (approximate date)
 Giles, Frankish abbot (approximate date)
 Jarir ibn Atiyah, Arab poet and satirist (approximate date)
 Sergius I, pope of Rome (approximate date)
 Shen Quanqi, Chinese poet and official (approximate date)
 Werburgh, Anglo-Saxon princess (approximate date)
 Yao Chong, chancellor of the Tang Dynasty (d. 721)

Deaths 
 Candrakīrti, Indian Madhyamaka philosopher (approximate date)
 Chen Yueyi, empress of Northern Zhou (approximate date)
 Ferchar mac Connaid, king of Dál Riata (modern Scotland)
 Fursey, Irish missionary (approximate date)

References

Sources